Zhang Yulin (born January 1958) is an astronautic engineer and lieutenant general of the People's Liberation Army (PLA) of China. He has been Deputy Director of the PLA General Armaments Department since 2011, and previously served as the President of the National University of Defense Technology (NUDT), and Commander of the Jiuquan Satellite Launch Center.

Biography
In 1958, Zhang was born in Qianyang County, Shaanxi Province. In 1978 Zhang entered NUDT, majoring in liquid rocket engine technology. Zhang graduated BE and ME from NUDT. From July 1984 Zhang was a lecturer and researcher at NUDT working on rocket engine dynamics and control. In 1988 Zhang graduated Doctor of Engineering from the Department of Industrial Automation of Zhejiang University. 

Zhang did postdoc research at Canada's University of Waterloo. He was a professor and then promoted to the head of the Department of Astronautic Technology at NUDT. Zhang was the Director of Beijing Research Institute of NUDT. In 2004 Zhang was appointed as Commander of the Jiuquan Satellite Launch Center in Inner Mongolia, which is the largest spaceport of China. In July 2008 Zhang was pointed as President of the National University of Defense Technology of PLA. Zhang was also an adjunct professor of Tsinghua University.

References

1958 births
Living people
People from Baoji
Engineers from Shaanxi
Educators from Shaanxi
National University of Defense Technology alumni
Zhejiang University alumni
Academic staff of Tsinghua University
Chinese aerospace engineers
Academic staff of the National University of Defense Technology
People's Liberation Army generals from Shaanxi
Presidents of the National University of Defense Technology
Delegates to the 11th National People's Congress